The canton of Allauch is an administrative division of the Bouches-du-Rhône department. Its seat is in Allauch.  It was created in 1973.
Its borders were modified at the French canton reorganisation which came into effect in March 2015.

Composition

At its creation in 1973, the canton was composed of the communes of Allauch and Plan-de-Cuques. Since the French canton reorganisation which came into effect in March 2015, the communes of the canton of Allauch are:

Allauch
Auriol
Belcodène
La Bouilladisse
Cadolive
La Destrousse
Gréasque
Peypin
Plan-de-Cuques
Saint-Savournin

Councillors

Pictures of the canton

See also 
 Cantons of the Bouches-du-Rhône department
 Communes of the Bouches-du-Rhône department

References

External links
 Website of the General Council of Bouches-du-Rhône

Allauch
1973 establishments in France